is a Japanese publisher, formerly named Heibon Shuppan Co., Ltd.

History 
The company was founded in October 1945 by Kinosuke Iwahori and Tatsuo Shimizu. Its first publications were the magazines Heibon  and Heibon Weekly. In 1964, it launched the influential men's magazine Heibon Punch.

Some of Magazine House's publications are as follows: an-an (women's fashion and lifestyle magazine; est. 1970), Croissant (women's magazine; est. 1977), Popeye (men's fashion magazine; est. 1976), and  Brutus (men's lifestyle magazine; est. 1980).

References

External links 
 Magazine House official website 

Japanese companies established in 1945
Magazine publishing companies in Tokyo
Book publishing companies in Tokyo
Publishing companies established in 1945